Laia Palau Altés (born 10 September 1979) is a Spanish professional basketball player, currently playing for Spanish team Spar CityLift Girona. At 314, she is the most capped player in the Spain women's national basketball team, after being in the senior team for two decades (2002-2021). With 12 medals in final tournaments, she is also the top medallist.

Club career
Palau began her professional career with Universitari de Barcelona in 1997, and continued to play with CBF Universitari de Barcelona through 2004, winning one league title. In 2004, she joined Bourges Basket, and played with them through 2006, winning 1 league and 2 French cups.

Back in Spain, she played for Ros Casares Valencia between 2006 and 2012, winning 5 league titles, 4 cups and the 2011–12 EuroLeague Women. After the club's decision not to play in top tier any more, in PLKK season 2012/13, she joined CCC Polkowice and won Championship's title and Polish Cup as well. With CCC she participated in EuroLeague Women 2012–13 reaching Final Eight and ranked #1 overall in Assists (6.4), #2 overall in Turnovers (3.8) and #2 overall in Minutes (36.2).

From 2013 to 2017 she played for USK Praha with whom she won the 2014–15 EuroLeague Women, 4 leagues and 2 cups. In 2017, after 20 years playing professionally in Europe, she signed for Australian team Jayco Rangers. In January 2018 she signed for EuroLeague French team Bourges Basket, winning both French League and French Cup. Back in Spain, she signed for Spar CityLift Girona, winning the 2019 league and the 2021 cup.

EuroLeague statistics

EuroCup statistics

National team
She made her debut with Spain women's national basketball team at the age of 22. She played with the senior team from 2002 until her retirement in 2021. She is the most capped player in the Spain national team with a total of 314 caps and with 5.9 PPG. She participated in 4 Olympic Games, 5 World Championships and in 10 European Championships:
4th 1995 FIBA Europe Under-16 Championship (youth)
8th 1997 FIBA Under-19 World Championship (youth)
 5th 2002 World Championship
  2003 Eurobasket
 6th 2004 Summer Olympics
  2005 Eurobasket
 8th 2006 World Championship
  2007 Eurobasket
 5th 2008 Summer Olympics
  2009 Eurobasket
  2010 World Championship
 9th 2011 Eurobasket
  2013 Eurobasket
  2014 World Championship
  2015 Eurobasket
  2016 Summer Olympics
  2017 Eurobasket
  2018 World Championship
  2019 Eurobasket
 7th 2021 Eurobasket
 6th 2020 Summer Olympics

References

External links
 
 
 
 
 
 

1979 births
Living people
Basketball players from Barcelona
Ros Casares Valencia players
Olympic basketball players of Spain
Spanish expatriate basketball people in Australia
Spanish expatriate basketball people in France
Spanish expatriate basketball people in Poland
Basketball players at the 2004 Summer Olympics
Basketball players at the 2008 Summer Olympics
Basketball players at the 2016 Summer Olympics
Basketball players at the 2020 Summer Olympics
Olympic silver medalists for Spain
Medalists at the 2016 Summer Olympics
Olympic medalists in basketball
Mediterranean Games bronze medalists for Spain
Mediterranean Games medalists in basketball
Competitors at the 2001 Mediterranean Games
Point guards